Club Atlético Chacarita Juniors (usually known simply as Chacarita) is an Argentine football club headquartered in Villa Crespo, Buenos Aires, while the stadium is located in Villa Maipú, General San Martín Partido of Greater Buenos Aires.

The squad currently plays in Primera Nacional, the second division of the Argentine football league system.

History
The club was founded on 1 May 1906, in an anarchist Library on the boundary between the Villa Crespo and Chacarita neighbourhoods. After a short period of institutional crisis, the club was re-opened in 1919.

The football squad promoted to Primera División in 1924, and continued playing at the top level after football became professional in 1931.

In 1940 Chacarita was relegated to the second division, but it lasted only one season. The team then moved to the General San Martín Partido in Greater Buenos Aires, next to the autonomous city of Buenos Aires.

In 1956 Chacarita was relegated to the second division again, and won that championship the following year returning to Primera División. After 10 consecutive years at the top level, Chacarita won its only first division title, the 1969 Metropolitano championship.

In the following years the team performed badly and was relegated all the way down to the 3rd division in 1980. In 1984 Chacarita came back to the first division, but because of Hooliganism by some of its fans, the club was punished with a suspension for a month and a loss of 10 points; having missing those points, Chacarita could not avoid a new relegation to the second division.

After a long tenure in lower divisions (including the Primera C), Chacarita came back to the top division in 1999, where the team remained until 2004 Torneo Clausura, when it was relegated to the Primera B Nacional.

In the 2008–09 season the club finished 2nd, after a 1–0 victory against Platense, with a goal scored in the last seconds of the match. This victory secured Chacarita a return to Primera División after five years of being relegated.

At the end of 2011–12 season, Chacarita finished 20th and therefore the Funebreros had to play two matches against Nueva Chicago (winner of Primera B Metropolitana's Torneo Reducido) to avoid being relegated to the lower division. Nueva Chicago won the series (1–0 and 1–1) and Chacarita was subsequently relegated.

Kit evolution

(1) Used during the 1931 championship as a tribute to club's first jersey.

Nickname
The team got the nickname of Funebreros ("Undertakers") because its ground was near the La Chacarita Cemetery. The red color in its jersey (apart from black and white) is a reference to its anarchist origins.

Stadium

Chacarita's stadium was reopened on 30 January 2011, after its closure for a total rebuilt (which consisted in replacing the old wood seats for the more modern cement structures, according to safety regulations) since May 2008. As part of the celebration for the reopening, the club organized a friendly match between Chacarita and Argentinos Juniors (which ended 0–0). For this special event only 13,260 seats were available. Once the remodelling is totally finished, the stadium will be able to host an attendance of 35,000.

The new stadium was erected in the same location where the old one was, in the Villa Maipú neighborhood, General San Martín Partido. The last game played by Chacarita before the remodelling had been on 21 October 2005, during a match for the Primera B Nacional championship. The rival was Tigre (which has a strong rivalry with Chacarita) and El Funebrero won 3–0.

Players

Current squad
.

Out on loan

Former players

Managers 

 Ernesto Duchini (1939–43)
 Alfio Basile (1975–76)
 Carlos Cavagnaro (1988)
 Héctor Rivoira (1997–00)
 Reinaldo Merlo (1998–99)
 Osvaldo Sosa (2000–02)
 Néstor Craviotto (2003)
 Néstor Clausen (2004–05)
 Héctor Rivoira (2005–07), (2011)
 Dalcio Giovagnoli (2008)
 Ricardo Zielinski (2008–09)
 Fernando Gamboa (2009–10)
 Mauro Navas (2010)
 Felipe De la Riva (2011–12)
 Carlos Navarro Montoya (2013)
 Carlos Fabián Leeb (2013–14)

Honours
 Primera División (1): 1969 Metropolitano
 División Intermedia (1): 1924
 Primera B (3): 1924, 1941, 1959, 1993–94

References

External links

 
  Informe Tricolor on Twitter
 Gloriosa Tricolor

 
Association football clubs established in 1906
1906 establishments in Argentina
Football clubs in Buenos Aires Province